Gimel Everett (February 7, 1951) is an American producer specializing in the science-fiction and horror genres. Her films The Lawnmower Man and Virtuosity (1995) feature groundbreaking computer animation and visual effects.

The Lawnmower Man is considered the first, seminal film to feature "Virtual Reality" as a cautionary tale becoming the number one commercially successful independent film of 1992, budgeted at just under $6 million and eventually earning over $150 million worldwide.

Virtuosity became the first major film to feature nanotechnology set in a cyberpunk based future casting Russell Crowe and Denzel Washington together a full 12 years before they would again co-star and many Oscar nominations later in a 2007 project (American Gangster).

Works

Film
 The Dead Pit 1989 (Writer, Producer, Editor)
 The Lawnmower Man 1992 (Writer, Producer, 2nd Unit Director)
 Hideaway 1995 (Producer)
 Virtuosity 1995 (co-producer)
 Man-Thing (DVD box title) 2005 (as Producer)

External links
 

American film producers
Living people
1951 births